Alexis Antunes Gomez (born 31 July 2000) is a Swiss professional footballer who plays as a midfielder for Swiss Super League club Servette.

Club career
A youth academy graduate of Servette, Antunes made his senior team debut on 24 February 2018 in a 4–0 win against Aarau. On 2 September 2019, Swiss Challenge League club Chiasso announced the signing of Antunes on a season long loan deal. He scored a hat-trick in Chiasso's 3–1 league win against Lausanne Ouchy on 2 August 2020.

International career
Antunes is a current Swiss youth international and has played for seven different youth national teams of Switzerland.

References

External links
 

2000 births
Living people
Association football midfielders
Swiss men's footballers
Switzerland youth international footballers
Switzerland under-21 international footballers
Swiss Super League players
Swiss Challenge League players
Servette FC players
FC Chiasso players
Footballers from Geneva